Konica Minolta Cup may refer to
 Japan LPGA Championship Konica Minolta Cup, was a golf competition
 WRU Challenge Cup, a Welsh rugby union competition

Konica Cup (before the Minolta merger) may refer to
 Konica Cup (football), a football competition